James Webb (1835–1895) was a British painter specialising in marine views and landscapes. He lived all his life in Chelsea, London.

Life
He was born in a family of artists.  His father Archibald Webb and his brother Byron Webb were also noted painters.  He exhibited in London at the Royal Academy and the British Institute between 1850 and 1888, and many of his works still hang in London in the collections of the Victoria and Albert Museum and the Tate Gallery. Other works are found in a large number of provincial galleries. Webb was a pupil of Clarkson Frederick Stanfield. 

He is buried on the east side of Highgate Cemetery.

Works 
 1857: The Lock
 1859: A Barge in a Norfolk Landscape
 1864: Fishing off the coast "Oil painting on canvas by James Webb", Richard Redding Antiques, includes one of the most detailed biographies available online
 1865: On a choppy sea
 1869: Mewstone
 1870: View of Cologne with incomplete dome
 c.1870: Stricken Vessel off Harbour with Watching Fisherfolk'
 1874: River Landscape
 1875: Fishing boats and shipping in Rotterdam in an evening calm. Sold to private collector.
1875: Seascape - which is held by Hartlepool Museum Service
 1875: Cartagena
 1875: Vessels moored at the steps of a Moorish palace
 1876: Givet

 1876: Dinant, Belgium
 1876-1885: Old Kew Bridge, London – which is held at the Museum of London
 1877: Heidelberg
 1883: Birkhamstead
 1888: Off to the fishing grounds
Undated
 Margate Pier, owned by Thanet District Council, on loan to Turner Contemporary gallery, Margate
 A View on the Rhine
 Shipping at sunset 
 The end of the day (attributed) 
 Cottages by the cliffs 
 Gazing across the loch 
 Sunset over Dordrecht Harbour 
 Brighton in the Season (described in one obituary as his 'most important work')
 Moonlight near Rotterdam, exhibited at St James's Gallery 1884

References

External links

English landscape painters
British male painters
1895 deaths
1825 births
Burials at Highgate Cemetery
English
Paint
19th-century British male artists